The Battle of Fort Dearborn (sometimes called the Fort Dearborn Massacre) was an engagement between United States troops and Potawatomi Native Americans that occurred on August 15, 1812, near Fort Dearborn in what is now Chicago, Illinois (at that time, wilderness in the Illinois Territory). The battle, which occurred during the War of 1812, followed the evacuation of the fort as ordered by the commander of the United States Army of the Northwest, William Hull. The battle lasted about 15 minutes and resulted in a complete victory for the Native Americans. After the battle, Fort Dearborn was burned down. Some of the soldiers and settlers who had been taken captive were later ransomed.

Following the battle, the federal government became convinced that all Indians had to be removed from the territory and the vicinity of any settlements, as settlers continued to migrate to the area. The fort was rebuilt in 1816.

Background

Fort Dearborn was constructed by United States troops under the command of Captain John Whistler in 1803. It was located on the south bank of the main stem of the Chicago River in what is now the Loop community area of downtown Chicago. At the time, the area was seen as wilderness; in the view of later commander, Heald, "so remote from the civilized part of the world." The fort was named in honor of Henry Dearborn, then United States Secretary of War. It had been commissioned following the Northwest Indian War of 1785–1795, and the signing of the Treaty of Greenville at Fort Greenville (now Greenville, Ohio), on August 3, 1795. As part of the terms of this treaty, a coalition of Native Americans and frontiersmen, known as the Western Confederacy, turned over to the United States large parts of modern-day Ohio, and various other parcels of land including  centered at the mouth of the Chicago River.

The British Empire had ceded the Northwest Territory—comprising the modern day states of Ohio, Indiana, Illinois, Michigan, Wisconsin, and parts of Minnesota—to the United States in the Treaty of Paris in 1783. The area had been the subject of dispute between the Native American nations and the United States, however, since the passage of the Northwest Ordinance in 1787. The Indian Nations followed Tenskwatawa, the Shawnee prophet and the brother of Tecumseh. Tenskwatawa had a vision of purifying his society by expelling the "children of the Evil Spirit", the American settlers. Tenskwatawa and Tecumseh formed a confederation of numerous tribes to block American expansion. The British saw the Native American nations as valuable allies and a buffer to its Canadian colonies and provided them arms. Attacks on American settlers in the Northwest further aggravated tensions between Britain and the United States. The Confederation's raids hindered American access to potentially valuable farmlands, mineral deposits and fur trade areas.

In 1810, as a result of a long running feud, Captain Whistler and other senior officers at Fort Dearborn were removed. Whistler was replaced by Captain Nathan Heald, who had been stationed at Fort Wayne, Indiana. Heald was dissatisfied with his new posting and immediately applied for and received a leave of absence to spend the winter in Massachusetts. On his return journey to Fort Dearborn, he visited Kentucky, where he married Rebekah Wells, the daughter of Samuel Wells, and they traveled together to the fort in June 1811.

As the United States and Britain moved towards war, antipathy between the settlers and Native Americans in the Fort Dearborn area increased. In the summer of 1811, British emissaries tried to enlist the support of Native Americans in the region, telling them that the British would help them to resist the encroaching American settlement. On April 6, 1812, a band of Winnebago Indians murdered Liberty White, an American, and John B. Cardin, a French Canadian, at a farm called Hardscrabble that was located on the south branch of the Chicago River, in the area now called Bridgeport. News of the murder was carried to Fort Dearborn by a soldier of the garrison named John Kelso and a small boy who had managed to escape from the farm. Following the murder, some nearby settlers moved into the fort while the rest fortified themselves in a house that had belonged to Charles Jouett, a Native American agent. Fifteen men from the civilian population were organized into a militia by Captain Heald, and armed with guns and ammunition from the fort.

Battle

On June 18, 1812, the United States declared war on the British Empire, and on July 17, British forces captured Fort Mackinac. On July 29, General William Hull received news of the fall of Fort Mackinac and immediately sent orders to Heald to evacuate Fort Dearborn, fearing that it could no longer be adequately supplied with provisions. In his letter to Heald, which arrived at Fort Dearborn on August 9, Hull ordered Heald to destroy all the arms and ammunition and give the remaining goods to friendly Indians in the hope of attaining an escort to Fort Wayne. Hull also sent a copy of these orders to Fort Wayne with additional instructions to provide Heald with all the information, advice and assistance within their power. In the following days, the sub-Native American agent at Fort Wayne, Captain William Wells, who was the uncle of Heald's wife, Rebekah, assembled a group of about 30 Miami Native Americans. Wells, Corporal Walter K. Jordan, and the Miamis traveled to Fort Dearborn to provide an escort for the evacuees.

Wells arrived at Fort Dearborn on August 12 or 13 (sources differ), and on August 14, Heald held a council with the Potawatomi leaders to inform them of his intention to evacuate the fort. The Native Americans believed that Heald told them that he would distribute the firearms, ammunition, provisions and whiskey among them, and that, if they would send a band of Potawatomis to escort them safely to Fort Wayne, he would pay them a large sum of money. However, Heald ordered all the surplus arms, ammunition and liquor destroyed "fearing that [the Native Americans] would make bad use of it if put in their possession." On August 14, a Potawatomi chief called Black Partridge warned Heald that the young men of the tribe intended to attack, and that he could no longer restrain them.

At 9:00 am on August 15, the garrison—comprising, according to Heald's report, 54 U.S. regulars, 12 militia, nine women and 18 children—left Fort Dearborn with the intention of marching to Fort Wayne. Wells led the group with some of the Miami escorts, while the rest of the Miamis were positioned at the rear. Heald reported that, upon discovering that the Indians were preparing to ambush from behind a dune, the company marched to the top of the dune, fired off a round and charged at the Native Americans.

This maneuver separated the cavalry from the wagons, allowing the overwhelming Native American force to charge into the gap, divide, and surround both groups. During the ensuing battle, some of the Native Americans charged at the wagon train that contained the women and children and the provisions. The wagons were defended by the militia, as well as Ensign Ronan and the fort physician Van Voorhis. The officers and militia were killed, along with two of the women and most of the children. Wells disengaged from the main battle and attempted to ride to the aid of those at the wagons. In doing so, he was brought down; according to eyewitness accounts he fought off many Native Americans before being killed, and a group of Indians immediately cut out his heart and ate it to absorb his courage. The battle lasted about 15 minutes, after which Heald and the surviving soldiers withdrew to an area of elevated ground on the prairie. They surrendered to the Native Americans who took them as prisoners to their camp near Fort Dearborn. In his report, Heald detailed the American loss at 26 regulars, all 12 of the militia, two women and twelve children killed, with the other 28 regulars, seven women, and six children taken prisoner. Survivors of the massacre filed different accounts regarding the Miami warriors. Some said they fought for the Americans, while others said they did not fight at all.

Accounts of the battle
The recollections of a number of the survivors of the battle have been published. Heald's story was recorded on September 22, 1812, by Charles Askin in his diary, Heald also wrote brief accounts of events in his journal and in an official report of the battle. Walter Jordan recorded his version of events in a letter to his wife dated October 12, 1812. Helm wrote a detailed narrative of events; but, because of his fear of being court martialed due to his criticism of Heald, delayed publication until 1814. John Kinzie's recollections of the battle were recorded by Henry Schoolcraft in August 1820.

These accounts of details of the conflict are discrepant, particularly in their attribution of blame for the battle. Juliette Magill Kinzie's Wau-Bun: The Early Day in the Northwest, which was first published in 1856, provides the traditional account of the conflict. However it is based on family stories and is regarded as historically inaccurate. Nonetheless, its popular acceptance was surprisingly strong.

The Battle of Fort Dearborn has also been referred to as "The Fort Dearborn Massacre" by the defending Americans. The battle has been claimed a massacre due to the large number of Americans killed including women and children, as opposed to the relatively smaller Potawatami losses incurred. The conflict has also been argued to have been a measure of self-defense on the part of the Potawatami.

Aftermath
Following the battle, the Native Americans took their prisoners to their camp near Fort Dearborn and the fort was burned to the ground. The region remained empty of U.S. citizens until after the war ended. Some of the prisoners died in captivity, while others were later ransomed. The fort, however, was rebuilt in 1816.

General William Henry Harrison, who was not present at the battle, later claimed the Miami had fought against the Americans, and used the Battle of Fort Dearborn as a pretext to attack Miami villages. Miami Chief, Pacanne, and his nephew, Jean Baptiste Richardville, accordingly ended their neutrality in the War of 1812, and allied with the British.

Historical perspective
Seen from the perspective of the War of 1812, and the larger conflict between Britain and France which precipitated it, this was a very small and brief battle, but it ultimately had larger consequences in the territory. Arguably, for the Native Americans, it was an example of "winning the battle but losing the war": the U.S. later pursued a policy of removing the tribes from the region, resulting in the 1833 Treaty of Chicago, which was marked at its culmination in 1835 by the last great Native American war dance in the then nascent city. Thereafter, the Potowatomie and other tribes were moved further west.

Location of the battle

Juliette Kinzie, shortly before her death in 1870, stated that the battle had started by a large cottonwood tree, which at that time still stood on 18th Street between Prairie Avenue and the lake. The tree was supposed to have been the last remaining of a grove of trees that had been saplings at the time of the battle.

The tree was blown down in a storm on May 16, 1894, and a portion of its trunk was preserved at the Chicago Historical Society. Historian Harry A. Musham points out that the testimony relating to this tree is all second hand and came from people who settled in Chicago more than 20 years after the battle. Moreover, based on the diameter of the preserved section of trunk (about ) he estimated the age of the tree at the time that it was blown over at no more than 80 years, and therefore asserts that it could not have been growing at the time of the battle. Nevertheless, the site at 18th Street and Prairie Avenue has become the location traditionally associated with the battle, and on the battle's 197th anniversary in 2009, the Chicago Park District, the Prairie District Neighborhood Alliance and other community partners dedicated "Battle of Fort Dearborn Park" near the site at 18th Street and Calumet Avenue.

Monuments

In 1893, George Pullman had a sculpture he had commissioned from Carl Rohl-Smith erected near his house. It portrays the rescue of Margaret Helm, the stepdaughter of Chicago resident John Kinzie and wife of Lt. Linai Taliaferro Helm, by Potawatomi chief Black Partridge, who led her and some others to Lake Michigan and helped her escape by boat. The monument was moved to the lobby of the Chicago Historical Society in 1931. In the 1970s, however, Native American groups protested the display of the monument, and it was removed. In the 1990s, the statue was reinstalled near 18th Street and Prairie Avenue, close to its original site, at the time of the revival of the Prairie Avenue Historic District. It was later removed for conservation reasons by the Office of Public Art of the Chicago Department of Cultural Affairs. There are some efforts to reinstall the monument, but it is meeting resistance from the Chicago American Indian Center.

The battle is also memorialized with a sculpture by Henry Hering called Defense that is located on the south western tender's house of the Michigan Avenue Bridge (which partially covers the site of Fort Dearborn). There are also memorials in Chicago to individuals who fought in the battle. William Wells is commemorated in the naming of Wells Street, a north–south street and part of the original 1830 58-block plat of Chicago, while Nathan Heald is commemorated in the naming of Heald Square. Ronan Park on the city's Far North Side honors Ensign George Ronan, who was the first West Point graduate to die in battle.

See also
 List of battles fought in Illinois

Notes and references

Notes

References

Bibliography

History of Chicago
Wars involving Illinois
Pre-statehood history of Illinois
Battles of the War of 1812 in Illinois
Battles in the Old Northwest
1812 in Illinois Territory
August 1812 events